Ritmerk is a small settlement north of Podgorci in the Municipality of Ormož in northeastern Slovenia. The area belonged to the traditional region of Styria. It is now included in the Drava Statistical Region.

There is a small chapel in the settlement. It dates to the late 19th to early 20th century.

References

External links
Ritmerk on Geopedia

Populated places in the Municipality of Ormož